Laetilia portoricensis is a species of snout moth in the genus Laetilia.

The species was described by Harrison Gray Dyar Jr. in 1915. It is found in Puerto Rico.

Laetilia portoricensis adults are generally brownish, but the costal margin of the forewing is light gray.

Diet 
The larvae have been recorded feeding on unidentified scale insects on Cajanus cajan and the scale insect Saissetia oleae on Spathodea campanulata. They have also been reared on withering stems of Chromolaena odorata.

References 

Moths described in 1915
Phycitini